The Lord Provost of Aberdeen is the convener of the Aberdeen City local authority in Scotland.

They are elected by the city council and serve not only as the chair of that body, but as a figurehead for the entire city. They are equivalent in many ways to the institution of mayor that exists in many other countries.

According to Munro  in Aberdeen up to the end of the sixteenth century, the provost was elected on the first Monday after Michaelmas. From then until 1833 the election took place on the first Wednesday after Michaelmas, and from then (at least until 1897) elections were held on the Friday after the first Tuesday in November. He gives the example of John Cheyne elected 1593 who would have continued in office until the Michaelmas election of 1594. The dates below, up to 1897 recognise this pattern.

Each of the 32 Scottish local authorities elects a Convener or provost, but only the cities of Glasgow, Edinburgh, Aberdeen and Dundee have a Lord Provost. While this was confirmed in the Local Government (Scotland) Act 1973 and subsequently in the Local Government etc. (Scotland) Act 1994 the title Lord Provost of Aberdeen was formally established in 1863 when Queen Victoria knighted Sir Alexander Anderson designing him 'Lord Provost of Aberdeen'. Until then, while various petitions, and other documents variously addressed the holder as Lord Provost, the title was correctly Provost of Aberdeen.

Since 1899, the Lord Provost of Aberdeen, has also been ex officio the Lord-Lieutenant of the city.  Following local government re-organisation brought about by the Local Government etc. (Scotland) Act 1994, this arrangement was confirmed in the Lieutenancies Act 1997.

13th century
  (1272–1273)  Richard Cementarius
  (1273–1274)  Mathew Greatheued
  (1281–1282)  Mathew Greatheued
  (1284–1285)  Malcolm de Pelgoueni

14th century
  (1309–1310)  Duncan de Malauill
  (1321–1322)  Duncan Kynnedy
  (1326–1329)  Symon Gelchach
  (1329–1332)  William Strabrock
  (1332–1333)  Symon Gelchach
  (1333–1335)  William Strabrock
  (1340–1341)  Colin Adamson
  (1341–1342)  David Fyngask
  (1343–1344)  Thomas Mercer
  (1348–1349)  Symon Lynton
  (1349–1351)  Robert Edynhame
  (1351–1356)  William Leith
  (1361–1363)  Thomas Mercer
  (1366–1367)  Laurence Garvock
  (1367–1368)  Laurence de Foty
  (1372–1374)  William Leith
  (1382–1383)  Alexander Bannerman
  (1383–1384)  John Tulloh
  (1385–1391)  Laurence de Foty
  (1391–1395)  William de Camera
  (1395–1396)  William Andrewson
  (1396–1399)  William de Camera
  (1399–1401)  Adam de Benyn

15th century

16th century

17th century

18th century

19th century

20th century

  (1902–1905)  James Walker of Richmondhill
  (1905–1908)  Sir Alexander Lyon
  (1908–1911)  Alexander Wilson
  (1911–1914)  Adam Maitland
  (1914–1919)  Sir James Taggart 
  (1919–1925)  Sir William Meff
  (1925–1929)  Sir Andrew Jopp Williams Lewis
  (1929–1932)  James Reid Rust 
  (1932–1935)  Sir Henry Alexander
  (1935–1936)  Edward William Watt
  (1936–1947)  Sir Thomas Mitchell 
  (1947–1951)  Duncan Fraser (Labour)
  (1951–1952)  William Reid 
  (1952–1955)  Reverend Professor John Graham (Labour)
  (1955–1961)  George Stephen 
  (1961–1964)  Reverend Professor John Graham(Labour)
  (1964–1967)  Norman Hogg, (Labour)
  (1967–1970)  Robert Lennox, (Labour)
  (1970–1971)  James Lamond, (Labour)
  (1971–1975)  John Farquharson Smith, (Labour)
  (1975–1977)  Robert Lennox, (Labour)
  (1977–1980)  William James Fraser  (Labour)
  (1980–1984)  Alexander C Collie  (Labour)
  (1984–1988)  Henry Rae, (Labour)
  (1988–1992)  Robert Robertson (Labour)
  (1992–1996)  James Wyness  (Labour)
  (1996–1999)  Margaret Farquhar  (Labour)  First female Lord Provost of Aberdeen
  (1999–2003)  Margaret Elizabeth Smith (Labour)

21st century
  (2003–2007)  John Michael Reynolds (Liberal Democrats)
  (2007–2012)  Peter James Stephen  (Liberal Democrats)
  (2012–2017)  George Adam  (Labour)
  (2017–2022) James 'Barney' Crockett(Labour – Party membership suspended as of May 2017)
 (2022-present) Dr David Cameron (Scottish National Party) - First SNP Lord Provost of Aberdeen

References

Memorials of the Aldermen, Provosts and Lord Provosts of Aberdeen 1272–1895, Alexander M Munro, 1897

Politics of Aberdeen
Aberdeen, Provosts and Lord Provosts of
Government of Scotland

Provosts and Lord Provosts